Ten United States presidents have made presidential visits to Eastern Europe and Northern Asia. The first trip by an incumbent president to Eastern Europe was made by Franklin D. Roosevelt in 1945, to the Soviet Union, and was an offshoot of Allied diplomatic interactions during World War II. The first trip by an incumbent president to Northern Asia was made by Gerald Ford in 1974, also to the Soviet Union, and was an offshoot of U.S.–Soviet Détente during the Cold War. The first presidential visits to other Eastern European countries occurred during this era of easing geo-political tensions as well.

As of February 2023, 15 visits have been made to Russia (which is partially in Eastern Europe as well as the only country in Northern Asia), 16 to Poland, five to the Czech Republic, five to Romania, five to Ukraine, four to Hungary, two to Bulgaria, one to Belarus, and one to Slovakia. Additionally, six visits were made to the Soviet Union prior to its collapse. One visit was also made to Czechoslovakia prior to its dissolution. Moldova is the only Eastern European country which has not been visited by a sitting American president.

Table of visits

See also
 Foreign policy of the United States

References

Lists of United States presidential visits
Diplomatic conferences
Belarus–United States relations
Bulgaria–United States relations
Czech Republic–United States relations
Hungary–United States relations
Moldova–United States relations
Poland–United States relations
Romania–United States relations
Russia–United States relations
Slovakia–United States relations
Soviet Union–United States relations
Ukraine–United States relations